Ruby was a late-night talk show broadcast on BBC Two in the United Kingdom.

The series premiered on May 12, 1997, and was hosted by writer and comedian Ruby Wax. In each episode Wax holds an unscripted roundtable discussion with up to five guests. Framed as a dinner party, guests included actors, writers, stand-up comedians, musicians, journalists and other well-known figures in the entertainment industry.

A total of 48 episodes were broadcast between May 1997 and November 2000.

Production

Each episode was recorded at BBC Television Centre. All episodes were pre-recorded, and often with no time limit. The conversation between Wax and her guests would sometimes last up to three hours, and would later be edited down to 40 minutes for broadcast. Multiple episodes could be recorded on the same day. The set was dressed as a restaurant and bar, and guests would eat, drink and smoke as if at a dinner-party. To add to the restaurant atmosphere, additional tables were populated by BBC staff including producers, secretaries, cafeteria and office workers.

Notable guests and episodes

Actress and writer Carrie Fisher appeared regularly on the series. Fisher and Wax had become close friends since first meeting on Wax's earlier series, The Full Wax. Fisher appeared in a total 7 episodes of the series.

According to his 2004 autobiography, talk show host Graham Norton first met Fisher when they both appeared as guests on the same episode, and also became good friends with her.

Actor and comedian Scott Thompson appeared during the series' third season, and spoke at length about witnessing the 1975 Brampton Centennial Secondary School shooting.

Actor Alan Cumming also appeared during the series' third season, and spoke at length of his experience of being stalked by obsessive fans while he was performing in the 1998 Broadway revival of Cabaret.

Reception

In reviewing the first three episodes, columnist Jasper Rees wrote in The Independent:

Episodes

Series 1 (1997)

The first series of 12 episodes was broadcast thrice-weekly, usually on Monday-Wednesday nights, in May and June 1997.

Series 2 (1998)

A second series of 12 episodes was broadcast thrice-weekly on Monday-Wednesday nights in July 1998.

Series 3 (1999)

A third series of 12 episodes was broadcast thrice-weekly on Monday-Wednesday nights in September and October 1999.

Series 4 (2000)

A fourth and final series of 12 episodes was broadcast on Monday-Thursday nights in October and November 2000.

References 

BBC television talk shows
1990s television talk shows
2000s television talk shows